"My Oh My" is a song by British band Sad Café, from their third album Facades (1979). It was released as a single in 1980 and was a top 20 hit, reaching No. 14 on the UK Singles Chart, and spending a total of 11 weeks on the chart.

Track listing
UK 7" single
A. "My Oh My"
B. "Cottage Love"

Charts

References

1979 songs
1980 singles
Sad Café (band) songs
RCA Records singles
Song recordings produced by Eric Stewart